Hajjiabad (also Romanized as Ḩājjīābād) is a village in Baz Kia Gurab Rural District, in the Central District of Lahijan County, Gilan Province, Iran. At the 2006 census, its population was 1,673, in 468 families.

References 

Populated places in Lahijan County